The Saga of Gösta Berling is a 1924 Swedish romantic drama film directed by Mauritz Stiller and released by AB Svensk FAB Svensk Filmindustri, starring Lars Hanson, Gerda Lundequist and Greta Garbo in her domestic film breakthrough. It is based on Swedish Nobel Prize-winning author Selma Lagerlöf's 1891 debut novel Gösta Berlings saga. The film is also known as Gösta Berling's Saga, The Story of Gösta Berling and The Atonement of Gösta Berling.

Plot
The story follows several major characters, including Gosta Berling himself and others, especially women, whose lives touch him and that he touches. The film includes several flashbacks and crosscuts to other scenes giving additional information about those characters..

An opening intertitle extols the beauty of Varmland and the (fictional) estate of "Ekeby."  A century earlier, the estate was home to a company of twelve "Cavaliers," former soldiers who spend their time idly and often drunkenly as guests of Margaretha Samzelius, wife of a former army major and referred to as the "Majoress."  On Christmas Eve, Gosta Berling, a defrocked Lutheran minister, leads evening revels and tricks the company with an appearance of a "devil," played by Sintram, a household servant.

Events later that evening lead to a flashback when Berling was still a minister but on the verge of being removed from his parish by the presiding bishop because of his habitual drunkenness.  Berling gives such a moving sermon, though, that the parishioners and bishop are ready to forgive him until he begins to denounce their hypocrisy.  Driven into exile, he becomes tutor to Ebba Dohna, stepdaughter of the mistress of Borg, an estate near Ekeby.  The mother hopes to have Ebba marry Berling so that she will be disinherited for marrying a commoner, allowing the mother's natural son, Hendrik, to become heir to the estate.

At that time, Hendrik returns from a trip to Italy with his new wife, Elizabeth.  At dinner that night, Berling's past is exposed, devastating Ebba, who is in love with him, but rousing the sympathy of Elizabeth.  Berling leaves Borg and is found half-frozen by Margaretha who brings him to Ekeby and makes him one of the Cavaliers.  Berling eventually learns of Ebba's death, apparently from grief, and Margaretha tells him of how she had left home under the curse of her mother because of her own love for a man.

Later, at a dinner party, Berling is one of several performers in pantomimes and skits.  In a scene with a young neighbor woman, Marianne Sinclaire, he kisses her, although the audience thinks it is part of the act.  Marianne's father, however, is outraged and leaves the party, with Marianne walking in the snow to their house, where her father refuses to let her in.  Back at the party, Margarethe's own past is exposed by one of the Cavaliers, and her husband the Major throws her out of the house.  Disgusted with life, the Major gives control of Ekeby to the Cavaliers, bitterly predicting that they will ruin the estate.

Berling searches for Margaretha but finds Marianne collapsed in the snow by her family's front door.  Berling takes her back to Ekeby but tries to keep her presence confidential since she has fallen ill.  In the meantime, Margarethe has returned to the cottage where her mother still lives, seeking forgiveness.  As the old woman collapses and lies dying, there is a partial reconciliation but Margarethe realizes that she must atone for her past by driving the Cavaliers out of Ekeby.

At Borg, Hendrik learns that his Italian marriage to Elizabeth will not be considered legal until they both sign certain documents.  At Ekeby, Berling considers marriage to Marianne, but she turns him away when she reveals that her face has been scarred by smallpox.  Margarethe, driven by her own guilt and rage, assembles a party to set fire to the wing of Ekeby housing the Cavaliers in order to capture and exile them, but the fire gets out of control and begins to burn the central mansion housing Marianne, whom Berling manages to save from the flames just as her father arrives, now relieved that his daughter is safe.

At Borg, seeing the fire, Elizabeth heads across the lake to Ekeby on foot, where she is discovered by Berling who was driving a sleigh across the ice.  At first, in a fit of passion, Berling proposes eloping and taking Elizabeth away from Varmland and beyond.  But he turns the sleigh back when he realizes that they are being pursued on the frozen lake by a pack of wolves, which they eventually outrun.

Back at Borg, Hendrik offers Elizabeth the new wedding documents to sign and legalize their marriage, but she has to confess that she has not given her heart to him, leading to the ultimate dashing of Hendrik's mother's hopes.  Elizabeth goes to live with the Sinclaires, where she and Marianne become good friends.  On a visit to Margarethe in her mother's cottage, Elizabeth confesses her love for Berling, who had just entered the room without her noticing.  Inspired by Marianne, Berling oversees the reconstruction of Ekeby.  Finally, Margarathe returns to the newly built estate, which she now offers as a home to Berling and Elizabeth.  The events are celebrated by the now-reformed Cavaliers.

Cast
 Lars Hanson as Gösta Berling
 Greta Garbo as Elizabeth Dohna
 Sven Scholander as Sintram
 Gerda Lundequist as Margaretha Samzelius
 Ellen Hartman-Cederström as Märtha Dohna
 Mona Mårtenson as Ebba Dohna
 Torsten Hammarén as Henrik Dohna
 Jenny Hasselqvist as Marianne Sinclaire
 Sixten Malmerfelt as Melchior Sinclaire
 Karin Swanström as Gustafva Sinclaire
 Oscar Byström as Patron Julius
 Hugo Rönnblad as Beerencreutz
 Knut Lambert as Örneclou
 Svend Kornbeck as Christian Bergh
 Otto Elg-Lundberg as Samzelius

Release

Restorations

The film was originally released in two parts in Sweden, Gösta Berlings saga del I on 10 March 1924, and Gösta Berlings saga del II seven days later. The two-part version was also released in Finland and Norway, but for the rest of the world a shorter, one-part export version was made.

In 1927 the film was recut, almost halving its running time. This was the only version that was archived. In 1933 a sound version was released theatrically in Stockholm, with the intertitles removed, along with additional edits and some reordering of the scenes. Most of the missing material was discovered 20 years later and a restored version with new intertitles was released in theatres. The Swedish Film Institute added newly found fragments throughout the years, but as of the 1975 restoration about 450 metres of film from the original cut remained missing.

In February 2018, the completion of a new, comprehensive restoration was announced. The 2018 version is 16 minutes longer than the previous restoration and brings the film close to its original running time. It also restores the film's tinting scheme for the first time since its original release.

Home media
In 2008, a Swedish DVD was released by AB Svensk Filmindustri, with English, French, Portuguese, Spanish and German subtitles. The 192-minute restoration played at 184 minutes, due to PAL's 4% speed-up. It featured a specially commissioned 2005 score by pianist and silent film music composer Matti Bye. The same version was also released on US DVD in 2006, by Kino International. It also played at 184 minutes as the NTSC DVD used the unconverted PAL transfer.

References

External links

 
 
 
 Gösta Berling's Saga part I and part II at the Swedish Film Database (in Swedish)

1924 films
1924 romantic drama films
Swedish silent feature films
Swedish black-and-white films
Films based on Swedish novels
Films based on works by Selma Lagerlöf
Films set in the 1820s
Films directed by Mauritz Stiller
Swedish romantic drama films
Silent romantic drama films